The Sri Lanka women's national cricket team represents Sri Lanka in international women's cricket. A full member of the International Cricket Council (ICC), the team is governed by Sri Lanka Cricket.

Sri Lanka played in its first and only Test match to date in April 1998, defeating Pakistan by 309 runs.

Sri Lanka made its One Day International (ODI) debut in 1997, against the Netherlands, and later in the year participated in the 1997 World Cup in India. , they have played 167 matches against 10 opponents. They have participated in six editions of the Women's Cricket World Cup, reaching the quarter-finals in 1997.

Since their first Women's Twenty20 International (WT20I) against Pakistan in 2009, Sri Lanka have played 100 matches. They have been most successful against Pakistan with 6 wins against them. They have participated in all editions of the Women's T20 World Cup, never progressing past the group stage.

Key

Test cricket

One Day International

Twenty20 International

References 

Cricket records and statistics
record by opponent